The spiny baskettail (Epitheca spinigera) is a dragonfly of the Corduliidae family.
Flight season is late May to early July.

Etymology 
The scientific name, spinigera, means spine-bearing.  The males have a sharp looking spine that points downward from the cerci (at the end of the abdomen).
The spine may be absent on rare occasions.

References

External links
 Epitheca spinigera on BugGuide.Net

Corduliidae
Insects described in 1871